Valley North is a constituency of the Anguillan House of Assembly. The incumbent is Evans Rodgers of the Anguilla United Front.

Representatives

Election results

Elections in the 2020s

|- class="vcard" 
  | style="background-color:"|
  | class="org" style="width: 130px" | AUF
  | class="fn" | Evans Rodgers
  | style="text-align:right;" | 697
  | style="text-align:right;" | 51.5
  | style="text-align:right;" | -16.1

Elections in the 2010s

Elections in the 2000s

Elections in the 1990s

Elections in the 1980s

Constituencies of the Anguillan House of Assembly